Jagjit Singh Chadha  (Punjabi: ਜਗਜੀਤ ਸਿੰਘ ਚਢਾ, born 1 December 1966 in West Yorkshire is a British economist who is the Director of the National Institute of Economic and Social Research.

He is on secondment from his position as Professor and Chair in Money and Banking in the Department of Economics at the University of Kent. He is Professor of Commerce at Gresham College and was Chair of the Money, Macro and Finance Research Group (now Money Macro and Finance Society) and was previously a specialist adviser to the Treasury Select Committee. He is also a part-time, Visiting Professor of Economics at Cambridge University.

Chadha obtained his education from The John Lyon School and then University College London and the London School of Economics. He then became an advisor and researcher at the Bank of England working on monetary economics, in particular on the interaction of financial markets and monetary regimes.

His earlier academic positions included: Lecturer in Macroeconomics in the Department of Economics at the University of Southampton, Fellow and Economics Director of Studies at Clare College, University of Cambridge, as well as a member of the Cambridge faculty  Professor of Economics and Director of the Centre for Dynamic Macroeconomic Analysis at the University of St Andrews.

After a period as the Chief Quantitative Economist at BNP Paribas, Chadha was appointed Professor of Economics in Keynes College at the University of Kent in 2007, where he is Chair in Money and Banking.

In August 2014, Chadha was appointed Mercers' School Memorial Professor of Commerce at Gresham College for a period of three years, replacing Douglas McWilliams. Chadha's first series of six free public lectures was on Money, Monetary Policy and Central Banks: The Meeting of Art and Science

Chadha has acted as an academic adviser to HM Treasury, the Treasury Select Committee and other policy-making institutions outside the UK. He was formerly Chair of the Money, Macro and Finance Research Group (MMF). He is the current Editor of the series Modern Macroeconomic Policy-making published by Cambridge University Press.

Chadha was appointed Officer of the Order of the British Empire (OBE) in the 2021 Birthday Honours for services to economics and economic policy.

Publications 
 Money, Monetary Policy and Central Banks: The Meeting of Art and Science
 The Euro in Danger, with Michael Dempster and Derry Pickford (Searching Finance, 2012)
 Modern Macroeconomic Policy Making (Cambridge University Press, 2010)
 Dynamic Macroeconomic Analysis: Theory and Policy in General Equilibrium , co-edited with Sumru Altug and Charles Nolan (Cambridge University Press, 2003)

References

External links 
All past Gresham College lectures on Gresham College
The Economics of the Business Cycle by Jagjit Chadha
Videos interviews with Jagjit Chadha

1966 births
Living people
Academics of the University of Kent
Academics of the University of Southampton
Academics of the University of St Andrews
Alumni of the London School of Economics
Alumni of University College London
BNP Paribas people
British Sikhs
Fellows of Clare College, Cambridge
People associated with the Bank of England
Professors of Gresham College
Officers of the Order of the British Empire